Farkas de Boldogfa, (in Hungarian: "boldogfai Farkas család"; in German: "Farkas von Boldogfa"), is the name of a Hungarian noble family. Their members were landowners that occupied diverse relevant roles in the political, administrative and jurisdictional life at least during the last 300 years in the county of Zala, located in the former Kingdom of Hungary. They held offices as vice-ispáns of the county of Zala (alispán of Zala), Prothonotary of the county of Zala, they were members of the Hungarian Parliament, and also were chief magistrates of the county's districts (főszolgabíró), Hussars etc.

The family's origins
Their early ancestors were  Roman Catholic border guards that lived in the towns of Unterwart and Oberwart in the Vas county of Hungary, in the small region known as Upper Őrség; they received nobility privileges during the reign of the King Béla IV of Hungary in the 13th century, after the Mongol invasion of 1241. These privilegies were confirmed by the Kings Stephen V of Hungary and Ladislaus IV of Hungary as well. On July 1 1327 the King Charles I of Hungary donated the nobility to this Farkas family and to all the border guards that lived in these two towns. The noble family possessed small lands through the end of the Medieval times and lost wealth considerably during the Turkish invasions in the 16th century. They received land donations on February 18 1582 to the states of Unterwart and Oberwart granted by Rudolf II, Holy Roman Emperor, King of Hungary. This same land donation was confirmed by Matthias, Holy Roman Emperor, King of Hungary on 16 February 1611.

Their descendant, the nobleman János Farkas de Alsóeőr, who lived in the beginning of the 17th century, was a landowner in Kančevci, which was located in the Vas county. This János Farkas de Alsóeőr had two sons: Lukács Farkas de Alsóeőr and Péter Farkas de Alsóeőr (fl. 1656). His son Péter Farkas (who was already very old for 1654) rented a small state in Pórszombat, which was located in the County of Zala. Péter's son, Mihály Farkas de Alsóeőr (fl. 1656-1664), who fought against the Turkish invaders was the one that bought the states in Zalaboldogfa (Boldogfa), in Zala county during the second half of the 17th century. Mihály Farkas married the local noble lady Éva Péter de Ságod, who gave birth three sons to him: János Farkas de Boldogfa, Péter Farkas de Boldogfa and István Farkas de Boldogfa. This branch of this Farkas family later used the Nobiliary particle of "de Boldogfa" as they received a royal donation to the state of Boldogfa from Charles VI, Holy Roman Emperor, King of Hungary, on 22 March 1716. In the other hand, the descendants of Lukács Farkas used the Nobiliary particle "de Alsóeőr" in honor to their original state were the family hailed from and that were donated by the King on the 16th Century. On April 2 1690. the noble Farkas family that lived in Kančevci received the donation of a coat of arms from the King Leopold I of Hungary; this coat of arms was used by both the families, the Farkas de Boldogfa and this particular branch of the family Farkas de Alsóőeőr.

The family Farkas de Boldogfa

The youngest son of Mihály Farkas and Éva Péter de Ságod was János Farkas de Boldogfa (†1724), who became a jurist and also had lands in Andráshida, Boldogfa and Alibánfa. He occupied the office of chief magistrate of the district of Zalaegerszeg between 1712 and 1721, and he was the first one who used the Nobiliary particle "de Boldogfa" after the royal donation of the land on 22 March 1716 granted by Charles VI, Holy Roman Emperor, who was also the King of Hungary. János Farkas de Boldogfa married Dorottya Sidy de Sid (1693–1775), the daughter of Mihály Sidy de Sid (fl. 1672–1711), vicecaptain of the castle of Egervár, landowner and the noble lady Maria Terjék de Szenterzsébet (fl. 1688–1692). The only son of János Farkas and Dorottya Sidy was Ferenc Farkas de Boldogfa (1713–1770), also a renowned jurist in Zala county. A part of the states he received from his father's patrimony, he also inherited states in Teskánd and Salomvár from his mother's side. Ferenc Farkas held the office of vice-ispán of the county of Zala (alispán of Zala) between 1761 and 1769, and also was one of the wealthiest landlords in the Zala county during Empress Maria Theresa's era, having through all his lands in total 70 families of serfs. His fortune increased considerably with the marriage with lady Anna Mária Rosty de Barkócz (1722–1784), who was the daughter of László Rosty de Barkócz, chief magistrate (főszolgabíró) of the Vas county and Mária Csapody de Zalalövő. Her maternal grandparents were István Csapody de Zalalövő (fl. 1663–1702), captain of the fortress of Zalalövő, landowner and Zsófia Perneszy de Osztopán (fl. 1651–1702), member of the ancient Hungarian noble family Perneszy de Osztopán. The illustrious noble family Rosty de Barkócz was well known, wealthy and took part in the politics and arts in the last centuries. Ferenc Farkas de Boldogfa inherited several states in Zala through his wife which originally belonged during the Medieval Times to the ancient and prestigious families Pogány de Cséb, Perneszy de Osztopán, Batthyány, and Both de Bajna, all ancestors of the noble lady Anna Rosty de Barkócz. After the War of the Austrian Succession began, in 1741 the Hungarian nobility assisted in fight Maria Theresa of Austria: Ferenc Farkas helped in the coordination of the Hungarian noblemen's organization within the county of Zala for this occasion. Ferenc Farkas de Boldogfa refurbished and expanded the Roman Catholic church of Zalaboldogfa also donating constantly to the local parish; he also built the  Roman Catholic family burial chapel in his state of on Zélpuszta, also located in the county of Zala. Ferenc Farkas de Boldogfa's brother in law was Ferenc Rosty de Barkócz (1718–1790), royal counselor of Queen Maria Theresa, vice-ispán of the Vas county (alispán of Vas), and a wealthy landowner (Ferenc Rosty was the great grandfather of Pál Rosty de Barkóc and also of Ágnes Rosty de Barkócz, who was the mother of the baron Loránd Eötvös).

Among the children of Ferenc Farkas de Boldogfa and Anna Rosty, two became priests: Ferenc Farkas de Boldogfa (1742–1807), a Jesuit priest, who was the master canon of the Diocese of Veszprém, and József Farkas de Boldogfa (1752–1809) Piarist priest, rector of the Piarist convent of Kolozsvár. Another of their children was János Farkas de Boldogfa (1741–1788), jurist, lawyer, landowner, Prothonotary of the county of Zala between 1773 and 1786. During the reign of Joseph II, Holy Roman Emperor, also King of Hungary, he started several legal modifications in the structure of the counties in Hungary. He separated the administrative and judicial office of alispán (chief deputy of the county), and created a new post that will administrate the judicial matters in the whole county. The new office was called "President of the Judiciary See of Zala county" (in Latin: "Inclyti Sedis Iudiciaria Comitatus Szaladiensis Praeses") and when it was created in 1787 János Farkas de Boldogfa was appointed to it. He held it only until 1788 when he passed away. János Farkas de Boldogfa is the common ancestor of the family's two branches that exist until the present time. János Farkas' wife was the noble lady Judith Sümeghy de Lovász et Szentmargit (1754–1820), daughter of Ferenc Sümeghy and Marianna Póka de Pókafalva (1728–1797), a wealthy landowrd in Zala county, who was descendant on mother side of a branch of the Nádasdy family, Csányi family, Tarródy family, Meszlény family, and several other illustrious Hungarian noble families. The brother in law of János Farkas de Boldogfa was József Sümeghy de Lovász et Szentmargita (1757–1832), royal counselor of Francis II, Holy Roman Emperor; József Sümeghy was vice-ispán of the county of Zala between 1797 and 1815, and also a wealthy landowner.

János' branch

The other son of János Farkas de Boldogfa and Judit Sümeghy de Lovász et Szentmargita was János Nepomuk Farkas de Boldogfa (1774–1847), jurist, landowner, vice-ispán of the county of Zala (alispán of Zala), who married the Hungarian noble lady Angéla Cecilia Skublics Besenyő et Velike (1775–1839). Their oldest son was Imre Farkas de Boldogfa (1811–1876), jurist, landowner, chief magistrate of the district of Zalaegerszeg (főszolgabíró). He married very late to Alojzia Horváth with which he had three children. One of the sons of Imre Farkas de Boldogfa and Alojzia Horváth was József Farkas de Boldogfa (1857–1951), jurist, landowner, politician. József Farkas de Boldogfa was elected as representative in the Hungarian Parliament for 4 terms: 1896–1901, 1901–1905, 1905–1906, and 1906–1910. József Farkas de Boldogfa was very active in the Hungarian politics since the 1890s, working along with count Aladár Zichy, and count Nándor Zichy within the newly created Hungarian Katolikus Néppárt (Catholic People's Party). He served as his only representative in Zala county and he was one of his greatest supporter. 

József Farkas de Boldogfa married the noble lady Rozália Sümeghy de Lovász et Szentmargitha (1857–1924), who gave birth to three sons. One of them was Tibor Farkas de Boldogfa (1883–1940), who finished his general studies of school and high-school with particular teachers and in the Theresianum in Wien. Later Tibor studied law in Wien and in Budapest, where he obtained his PhD degree and approved his lawyer exam in 1910. Then he traveled to England and studied law in the Cambridge University for 3 years. He also taught law in the London School of Economics. During the World War I Tibor Farkas fought in the front as a Hussar Captain. After the finish of the war and he became one of the most energetic defenders of the Monarchy and of the House of Habsburg in Zala county and Hungary itself. Tibor had a close friendship with the Marquis György Pallavicini, the Count Antal Sigray and Count János Zichy, who were the most relevant legitimist politicians between the two World Wars in Hungary. He was elected two times as a representative in the Hungarian Parliament: 1922–1926, and 1931–1935. He strongly criticized the government of prime minister count István Bethlen and the high cult to regent Miklós Horthy, considering that these demonstrations of honor and respect actually belonged to the Hungarian King, who was not sitting in the throne for that time. Tibor Farkas also was against all Nazi politics; his only goal was to reestablish continuity and see the Habsburgs in the Hungarian throne, and ensure the healthy development and growing of Hungarian agriculturists' way of life. The youngest son of József Farkas and Rozália Sümeghy was Dénes Farkas de Boldogfa (1884–1973), landowner, politician, member of the Hungarian Parliament, who took part of the Hungarian Revolution of 1956.

Ferenc's branch

One of the children of János Farkas de Boldogfa and Judit Sümeghy de Lovász et Szentmargita was Ferenc Farkas de Boldogfa (1779–1844), landowner, jurist, judge. He married at a very late age and had five children with Borbála Joó (1811–1881). Their eldest son was Ferenc Farkas de Boldogfa (1838–1908), landowner, Zala county auditor and monetary comptroller of the county. Ferenc Farkas de Boldogfa took an active role in Zala county's society. He was one of the first local supporters of the introduction of fire-fighting and he even assisted personally on several occasions to put out fires. On 2 December 1883 he was elected vice auditor of Zala county. He was one of the first members of the agricultural circle of Zala when it was founded in 1887. On 5 October 1890 he was appointed as honorary auditor of Zala county. On 29 December 1901 Ferenc Farkas de Boldogfa was elected as a juryman of the county. On 2 December 1904 he was appointed as the monetary comptroller of Zala county by the Kingdom's minister of finance. Ferenc Farkas also was a great supporter of the political Party of Independence and '48, and had great respect for Lajos Kossuth. His wife was the noble lady Zsófia Marton de Nemesnép (1842–1900), whose father was József Marton de Nemesnép (1797–1858), landowner in Andráshida, and vice chief magistrate of the district of Zalalövő (alszolgabíró).

Four children were born from the marriage of Ferenc Farkas de Boldogfa and Zsófia Marton de Nemesnép. The oldest one was dr. István Farkas de Boldogfa (1875–1921) who finished his studies of law on 25 June 1901 in the Franz Joseph University of Cluj-Napoca (in Hungarian: Kolozsvár). He was elected supreme chief magistrate of district of Sümeg (főszolgabíró) in 1911 and held that office until 1919. István Farkas de Boldogfa had two wives: the first one was the noble lady Erzsébet Persay de Persa (1885–1913), daughter of Gyula Persay de Persa (1855–1924), pharmacist, landowner, director of the Savings Bank of Nova, and Erzsébet Kiss de Nemeskér (1867–1888). István Farkas' second wife was the noblelady Johanna Horváth de Pósfa (1883–1919), daughter of János Horváth de Pósfa (1839–1923), director of the engine factory of the company Hungarian State Railways, Knight of Order of Franz Joseph, and Irma Forintos de Forintosháza (1860–1916). From his first marriage three children were born; among them was Endre Farkas de Boldogfa (1908–1994), Major of the General Staff of the Hungarian Armies during World War II. He was Head of the National Mobility Department at the Ministry of Public Supply during the war.

Endre Farkas de Boldogfa married in 1942 the wealthy the Roman Catholic Gobelin tapestry artist Klára Lenz (1924–2013), member of the high Bourgeoisie of Budapest. After the marriage Endre Farkas de Boldogfa became landlord at Tiszadob owning a state of 1000 hectares. Both Endre and Klára later emigrated to Venezuela after the World War II. Klára Lenz's father was József Lenz (1897–1965), a wealthy Hungarian landowner, tradesman of exotic fruits, Hussar captain of the Royal Hungarian Army. József Lenz was the owner of 12 urban palaces in Budapest and built up and donated the only Roman Catholic church of Nyékládháza in 1943; for this charitative gesture the Pope Pius XII decorated József Lenz with the "Pro Ecclesia et Pontifice". Klára Lenz's mother was Klara Topits (1901–1993), daughter of the member of the high Bourgeoisie of Budapest, Alajos József Topits (1855–1926), owner and director of the pasta factory "Son of Joseph Topits" (in Hungarian: Topits József fia) located in Budapest (which was the first pasta factory of the Kingdom); Alajos Topits was also Knight of the Order of Franz Joseph, and member of the Industrial Council of Hungary from 1893.

The youngest son of Ferenc Farkas de Boldogfa and Zsófia Marton de Nemsnép was Vitéz Sándor Farkas de Boldogfa (1880 –1946), a colonel of the Kingdom of Hungary. He was appointed as General Captain of the Order of Vitéz of the county of Zala in 1935. He occupied the office until 1939, when he resigned because of serious health problems. He was a close friend of the Count Béla Teleki de Szék (1896–1969), who was the lord-lieutenant of Zala county (zalai főispán). Sándor Farkas de Boldogfa was also knight of the Order of the Austrian Iron Crown. On 22 September 1920 Sándor Farkas de Boldogfa married the noble lady Katalin Csomasz de Adorjánháza (1897–1964), who played also an important social role during the World War II in the county of Zala, as she was the president of the Hungarian Red Cross of the county, and other organizations as well. She gave birth two boys to him: Lóránd and Tamás.

Notable members
Ferenc Farkas de Boldogfa (1713–1770), jurist, landowner, vice-ispán of the county of Zala (alispán of Zala).
János Farkas de Boldogfa (1741–1788), jurist, lawyer, landowner, Prothonotary of the county of Zala.
Ferenc Farkas de Boldogfa (1742–1807) Jesuit priest, parish priest of Nemesapáti, poet, master canon of the Diocese of Veszprém.
József Farkas de Boldogfa (1752–1809) Piarist priest, rector of the Piarist convent of Kolozsvár.
János Nepomuk Farkas de Boldogfa (1774–1847), jurist, landowner, vice-ispán of the county of Zala (alispán of Zala).
Imre Farkas de Boldogfa (1811–1876), jurist, landowner, chief magistrate of the district of Zalaegerszeg (főszolgabíró).
Ferenc Farkas de Boldogfa (1838–1908), economyst, landowner, Zala county auditor and monetary comptroller of the county.
József Farkas de Boldogfa (1857–1951), jurist, landowner, politician, Member of the Hungarian Parliament.
Dr. István Farkas de Boldogfa (1875–1921), jurist, supreme chief magistrate of district of Sümeg (főszolgabíró) in the county of Zala.
Vitéz Sándor Farkas de Boldogfa (1880– 1946), colonel of the Kingdom of Hungary, captain of the Order of Vitéz of the county of Zala. He was knight of the Order of the Iron Crown
Kálmán Farkas de Boldogfa (1880–1944), landowner, supreme chief magistrate of the district of Zalaszentgrót (főszolgabíró) in the county of Zala.
Dr. Tibor Farkas de Boldogfa (1883–1940), jurist, landowner, politician, member of the Hungarian Parliament, Hussar Captain. He was a respected Hungarian legitimist politician.
Dénes Farkas de Boldogfa (1884–1973), landowner, politician, member of the Hungarian Parliament.
Sándor Boldogfai Farkas (1907–1970), Hungarian sculptor, medalist.
Endre Farkas de Boldogfa (1908–1994), Major of the General Staff of the Hungarian Armies during World War II, a prominent member of the Venezuelan-Hungarian community. His wife was Klára Lenz (1924–2013) a Hungarian Gobelin tapestry artist.

Main alliances
Baranyay de Baranyavár
Baranyay de Kurtakesz
Bertha de Felsőeőr
Csány de Csány
Csillagh de Csáford
Csomasz de Adorjánháza
Dóczy de Muzsaj
Dulánszky de Doliánszk
Egressy de Boszörcsök
Forintos de Forintosháza
Gaál de Gyula
Hertelendy de Hertelend
Horváth de Pósfa
Jagasics de Lovász
Marton de Nemesnép
Móricz de Técső
Miklós de Dálnok
Pálffy de Pálfiszegh
Persay de Persa
Rosty de Barkóc
Sartory de Derzs et Besztercebánya 
Sidy de Sid
Sümeghy de Lovász et Szentmargitha
Skublics de Besenyő et Velike
Svastics de Bocsár
Szladovits de Szladeovic
Strausz de Strauszenbergh
Szűcs de Szentjános
Tóth de Tóthfalu
Tuboly de Tubolyszegh
Udvardy de Udvard et Básth
Viosz de Nemesvita

Notes

Hungarian Roman Catholics
People from Zala County
 
Hungarian nobility
Hungarian noble families